The Heckler & Koch VP9 (known as SFP9 in Europe and Canada) is a polymer-framed semi-automatic striker-fired handgun. The VP designation in the name refers to Volkspistole, which translates to "people's pistol", while SFP stands for "striker-fired pistol". The 9 stands for the caliber designation of 9 mm. The VP9 is the third striker-fired pistol that HK has produced. A variant of the VP9, the VP40, is chambered for .40 S&W; the VP40 is known as SFP40 in Europe and Canada.

History

According to the manufacturer, Heckler & Koch (HK), the pistol was under development for more than four years before its release in June 2014.  Originally, it was designed on request of the Bavarian State Police, to replace the HK P7. As HK has a long history with striker-fired pistols, they decided to update their lineup with a newly designed striker system that gives their pistols a single stage-like trigger feel with a clean break. The original name for the pistol was, "P30X," as it is essentially a striker-fired derivative of the Heckler & Koch P30. However, it was changed to "VP9" for the U.S. commercial market.

Design details
The VP9 is a striker-fired pistol that features a Picatinny rail, ambidextrous controls, a hammer forged polygonal barrel, and changeable back and side straps to make the pistol grip customizable for any shooter's hand with 27 options of grip configuration. It was in development for more than four years and is Heckler & Koch's first striker-fired handgun since the P7 series pistols were introduced in the 1980s. The pistols are made in Heckler & Koch's Oberndorf factory in southwest Germany.

Most striker-fired handguns have a pre-travel pull that increases in weight as the shooter squeezes it rearward. The VP9 trigger has a short, light take-up with a solid, single action type break followed by a short positive reset. The VP9 trigger has a consistent pre-travel pull followed by a positive set with clean break. Disassembly does not involve releasing the striker by squeezing the trigger.

Both the VP9 and VP40 use Heckler & Koch's ergonomic handgun grip design that includes three changeable backstraps and six side panels that allow the pistol's to fit any and all hand sizes. Molded finger grooves in the front of the pistol's grip also instinctively position the shooters hand for optimal shooting.

Although influenced by other HK models, the VP9 has a few innovations of its own. The controls are completely ambidextrous. A slide release is present on both sides of the frame and the magazine release can be easily activated by left- or right-handed shooters.

A new feature is HK's patented charging supports. They are simple components that are mounted on each side of the rear of the slide and provide better gripping leverage for racking the slide rearward. The charging supports speed reloading and make operating the VP9 easier for shooters with reduced hand strength. The VP pistols use the same steel magazines as the Heckler & Koch P30 in both the 15 and 10-round capacity configurations.

The VP9 has an extended full size Picatinny MIL-STD-1913 rail molded into its polymer frame for mounting lights and accessories. The rail has been tested and certified to handle the heavier mounted accessories because of its full size which adds rigidity. This rigidity gives the VP9 superior capabilities compared to some of its polymer competitors whose frames flex under use and cannot handle the weight of some of the medium to larger mounted lights.

In the United States, the VP9 is available from retailers as a standard package (standard three-dot sights and two magazines included) or as a "LE" (Law Enforcement) package (factory-equipped tritium night sights and three magazines included). The night sights are Meprolight Tru-Dot.  In late 2018, HK introduced the VP9 B (B for "button"), equipped with a push-button magazine release, in response to the preferences of the American market.  In January 2020, HK updated the VP9 design with a slide cutout for mounting pistol red-dot optics, new higher-capacity 17-round magazines to replace the 15-round magazines, and iron sights with a blacked-out rear bladed sight, replacing the previous three-dot setup, all as new standard features for the pistol.

Variants

European variants

SFP9 SF

Due to its trigger characteristics, the SFP9 SF variant is marketed by Heckler & Koch as a Special Forces pistol and not as a police duty pistol.

SFP9 TR
The Technical Specifications (TR) of the German Police (Technische Richtlinie Pistolen im Kaliber 9mm x 19, Revision January 2008) for obtaining a German Police duty pistol certification require a first shot trigger pull of ≥, a trigger travel of ≥ and a trigger reset of ≥.

SFP9 M
Maritime variant with saltwater resistant coating (meeting NATO AC225 salt spray test and long-term saltwater test requirements) and OTB (Over The Beach) capability.

SFP9 OR
Optics ready variant with  trigger.

SFP9 SD
Variant with  threaded barrel (SD = Schalldämpfer), adjustable Super-Luminova night sights by LPA and short-reset, reduced trigger pull SF trigger. Note: This variant is often referred to as "SFP9 Tactical", but the correct designation is "SFP9 SD". Accordingly, the word "Tactical" is not found on the slide.

SFP9 SK
Sub compact variant with shortened grip and  barrel. (SK = Subkompakt)

SFP9 SK SF
Sub compact variant of the SFP9 SF

SFP9 L
Variant with  barrel. (L = Long)

SFP9 Match OR
Optics ready variant with  barrel and exclusive to this variant  match trigger and magwell, comes with 20-round magazines.

American variants

VP9
Standard version for the American market. Ships with two magazines and standard three-dot sights.

VP9SK
Subcompact variant, ships with two 10-round magazines.

VP9LE/VP9SKLE
Law enforcement variant that includes an additional magazine and tritium night sights.

VP Tactical 
Variant with  threaded barrel and fixed night sights; ships with three magazines.

VP Tactical OR 
Optics ready variant with  threaded barrel and fixed suppressor-height night sights; ships with three magazines.

VP9 B
American-style button magazine release version of the original VP9.

VP9 L
As of 2019, a "slide conversion kit" is available from the manufacturer that converts a VP9 or VP9 B to a long slide model, equivalent to the European SFP9 L.

VP9 Match
Optics ready variant with  barrel and  trigger, comes with 20-round magazines.

Users

Bavarian State Police – Around 40,000 units ordered. Police officers will be equipped with the SFP9 by 2019.
Berlin Police – 24,000 SFP9 TR pistols and 450 SFP9 SK (subcompact) pistols were ordered in December 2017 with deliveries in 2018.
State Police of Lower Saxony – Approx. 22,000 pistols will consecutively replace the former P2000 pistols.
State Police of Saxony – More than 11,000 SFP9 pistols ordered in 2015. (Deliveries will take place from 2016 to 2018).
State Police of Brandenburg – Approx. 8,000 SFP9 pistols replacing the P228.
State Police of Mecklenburg-West Pomerania – 5,700 pistols ordered.
German Navy - Kommando Spezialkräfte Marine (Kampfschwimmer)- SFP9-SF M variant 

 Japan Ground Self-Defense Force - Replacement for the SIG P220. Beginning in 2020, 323 pistols were purchased in 2020 for $279,000.
 Reportedly used by some police units stationed at the Tokyo Olympics in 2021.

Grand Ducal Police – Approx. 1,700 SFP9 pistols replacing the Smith & Wesson 686 as of 2017.

Lithuanian Armed Forces - The SFP9 SF variant was selected by the Lithuanian Ministry of Defence as the future service pistol for the Lithuanian Armed Forces as of 2020.

Phenix City, Alabama Police Department – 107 VP40 pistols will replace the department's Glock pistols.
Madison Police Department, Wisconsin – Officers can choose to carry an HK VP9 over other Glock offerings.

Cantonal police of Basel-Stadt – 900 pistols.

500 SFP9 were announced to be delivered in March 2023.

References

37. City of Hyattsville, MD purchases VP9 Pistols for replacement of existing sidearms for its officers.
https://legistarweb-production.s3.amazonaws.com/uploads/attachment/pdf/107893/Weapons_transition_final_memo.pdf

Further reading

External links

 
 VP9 Operator's Manual (3rd edition, August 2014) via Wayback Machine
 HK VP9 at Modern Firearms
 Test firings by Hickok45: VP9, VP9SK, VP40

.40 S&W semi-automatic pistols
9mm Parabellum semi-automatic pistols
Heckler & Koch pistols
Short recoil firearms
Police weapons